Umjaba is a genus of cicadas from Madagascar

References

Platypleurini
Insects of Madagascar
Cicadidae genera
Taxa named by William Lucas Distant
Insects described in 1904